Las películas de mi vida (translated as The Movies of My Life: A Novel) is a 2002 semi-autobiographical novel by Chilean writer Alberto Fuguet. The novel has received a significant amount of critical attention.

Plot summary

The protagonist of the novel recounts his life story, which oscillates between Chile and California. He begins by describing his early years spent in California and uses the movies he watched during that time to paint a picture of his life. However, he is forced to abruptly return to Chile during his early teens, where he must now live under the regime of Augusto Pinochet, which proves to be a major cultural shock for him.

External links
Pop Matters review
Powell's Books

2002 Chilean novels
Novels by Alberto Fuguet
Novels set in Chile
Novels set in California